The Jean Cocteau Cinema is a historic movie theater located in Santa Fe, New Mexico, United States. It is owned by American author George R. R. Martin. In addition to films, the cinema hosts author talks and book-signings, along with a small display of signed books for sale; burlesque, magic and variety shows; art exhibitions and concerts.

History
In 1976, four partners (Lynne Cohen, Mary Hether, Anne Lewis and Richard Szanyi) opened the first movie theater on the site, The Collective Fantasy.  In 1983 Brent Kliewer bought the theater, remodeled it, and renamed it The Jean Cocteau (for the famed French novelist and filmmaker). The theatre closed in 2006 before being purchased and renovated by Martin.

References

External links

1910 establishments in the United States